Madison Louise Stubbington is an Australian fashion model.

Career 

Stubbington was discovered at a modelling competition in Adelaide when she was 14. In her debut season, she walked for Saint Laurent (for whom she was also cast in a campaign co-starring Harleth Kuusik), Balenciaga, Dion Lee, Fendi, Giambattista Valli, Vionnet, Louis Vuitton, Jean-Paul Gaultier, Yohji Yamamoto, and Miu Miu. Stubbington appeared in a Vogue editorial featuring famous gingers. She took a hiatus from modelling, for health reasons, and returned at a healthier size. Gucci responded with dissent. In 2021, Stubbing walked in Gucci's "Love Parade" show in Hollywood.

Stubbington was ranked on models.com's "Top 50 Models" list.

References 

1997 births
Living people
Australian female models
People from Adelaide
Australian expatriates in the United States